Erathu  is a gram panchayat in Pathanamthitta district, Adoor Tehsil, Parakod Block  in the state of Kerala, India. This panchayat covers the revenue entity of Erathu village and has an area of 21.74 km2.

Demographics
 India census, Erathu had a population of 23296 with 11246 males and 12050 females.

Boundaries 
East- Ezhamkulam Panchayat and Adoor Municipality

West- Kadampanad Panchayat and Pallickal Panchayat

North- Pallickal Panchayat and Adoor Municipality

South- Ezhamkulam Panchayat and Kadampanad Panchayat

Wards 
As of now Erathu consists of 17 wards. The number of wards have been increased over the years according to the increase in population though there was no increase in the land area.
 Manakala
 Vellaramkunnu
 Ayyankoickal
 Paruthippara
 Murukankunnu
 Kilivayal
 Vayala
 Pulimala
 Puthusseribhagom
 Maharshikkavu
 Chathannooppuzha
 Choorakkodu
 Sreenarayanapuram
 Anthichira
 Thuvayoor vadakku
 Janashakthi

References

Villages in Pathanamthitta district